Abdolhossein Rouholamini is an Iranian scientist and conservative politician. He is secretary-general of the Development and Justice Party and works as an assistant professor at Tehran University of Medical Sciences.

He is also an advisor to Mohsen Rezaee, and formerly headed the Pasteur Institute in Tehran.

References

External links 
 Academic webpage

Living people
Secretaries-General of political parties in Iran
Mojahedin of the Islamic Revolution Organization politicians
Society of Devotees of the Islamic Revolution politicians
Development and Justice Party politicians
Year of birth missing (living people)